The Satellite Award for Best Original Song is an annual award given by the International Press Academy.

Winners and nominees

1990s

2000s

2010s

2020s

References

Song Original
Film awards for Best Song